Trevor Stewardson (born March 28, 1977, in Thunder Bay, Ontario) is a boxer from Canada, competing in the light heavyweight (– 81 kg) division. He represented Canada at the 2004 Summer Olympics in Athens, Greece. He was eliminated in the second round by Ahmed Ismail of Egypt who went on to win the bronze medal. He qualified for the Olympic Games by placing second at the 2nd AIBA American 2004 Olympic Qualifying Tournament in Rio de Janeiro, Brazil.

Stewardson moved to Medicine Hat, Alta. in the leadup to the Olympics but was almost denied entry to the 2004 Games because of miscommunication between him and Boxing Canada. Stewardson's camp appealed the Canadian Olympic Committee's initial decision not to have Stewardson on the team and won the appeal just weeks before the Games were to begin.

In 1998 he won a bronze medal in the 1998 Commonwealth Games at Kuala Lumpur, Malaysia.

Since Athens Stewardson has remained in Medicine Hat and in 2008 began a pro career in mixed martial arts. He won his first bout April 26 at an event called Urban Conflict at the Calgary Corral, defeating London, Ont. native Jacob McDonald with a knockout 39 seconds into the first round. His second fight, July 19 at King of the Cage Canada's Excalibur event at Rexall Place in Edmonton, Alta., was against Vancouver, B.C. native Marcus Hicks. Stewardson won that fight by way of knockout at the 3:25 mark of the first round.

On August 27, 2009, Stewardson is slated to make his pro boxing debut against AJ Bone at a card in Taber, Alta.

Mixed martial arts record

|-
|Loss
|align=center|5-2
|Jason Day
|Submission (twister)
|Rumble in the Cage 35
|
|align=center|2
|align=center|4:12
|Lethbridge, Alberta, Canada
|
|-
|Win
|align=center|5-1
|Jason Volpe
|TKO (punches)
|King Of The Cage Canada: Turbulence
|
|align=center|1
|align=center|0:26
|Edmonton, Alberta, Canada
|
|-
|Win
|align=center|4-1
|Geoffrey Chambers
|KO (punch)
|King Of The Cage Canada: Grinder
|
|align=center|1
|align=center|1:27
|Calgary, Alberta
|
|-
|Win
|align=center|3-1
|Brendan Seguin
|TKO (punches)
|Raw Combat: Redemption
|
|align=center|3
|align=center|2:03
|Calgary, Alberta, Canada
|
|-
|Loss
|align=center|2-1
|Nick Hinchliffe
|Decision (unanimous)
|King Of The Cage Canada: Unrefined
|
|align=center|3
|align=center|5:00
|Edmonton, Alberta, Canada
|
|-
|Win
|align=center|2-0
|Marcus Hicks
|TKO (punches)
|King Of The Cage Canada: Excalibur
|
|align=center|1
|align=center|3:25
|Edmonton, Alberta, Canada
|
|-
|Win
|align=center|1-0
|Jacob MacDonald
|TKO (punches)
|Fighters Nation: Urban Conflict 
|
|align=center|1
|align=center|0:39
|Edmonton, Alberta, Canada
|
|-

References

External links
 

1977 births
Living people
Light-heavyweight boxers
Boxers at the 2004 Summer Olympics
Olympic boxers of Canada
Sportspeople from Thunder Bay
Boxers at the 1998 Commonwealth Games
Commonwealth Games bronze medallists for Canada
Canadian male mixed martial artists
Mixed martial artists utilizing boxing
Canadian male boxers
Boxing people from Ontario
Commonwealth Games medallists in boxing
Medallists at the 1998 Commonwealth Games